Konstantin Aleksandrovich Zubov (20 September, 1888 – 22 November, 1956) was a Soviet and Russian actor, film and theater director and pedagogue. People's Artist of the USSR (1949).

Selected filmography 
 1916 — Nelli Raintseva
 1917 — Revolutionary
 1928 — The Lame Gentleman
 1933 — Marionettes
 1940 — Yakov Sverdlov

References

External links 
 Константин Зубов on kino-teatr.ru

1888 births
1956 deaths
20th-century Russian male actors
Film directors from the Russian Empire
Male actors from the Russian Empire
People from Karsunsky Uyezd
Members of the Supreme Soviet of the Russian Soviet Federative Socialist Republic, 1955–1959
Russian State Institute of Performing Arts alumni
Honored Artists of the RSFSR
People's Artists of the RSFSR
People's Artists of the USSR
Stalin Prize winners
Recipients of the Order of Lenin
Recipients of the Order of the Red Banner of Labour
Russian drama teachers
Russian film directors
Russian male film actors

Russian male stage actors
Russian theatre directors
Soviet drama teachers
Soviet film directors
Soviet male film actors
Soviet male stage actors
Soviet theatre directors
Burials at Novodevichy Cemetery